George Park Fisher (August 10, 1827 – December 20, 1909) was an American theologian and historian who was noted as a teacher and a prolific writer.

Biography
He was born in Wrentham, Massachusetts. He graduated from Brown University in 1847, and then studied theology at Yale Divinity School and the Andover Theological Seminary. He graduated from the latter institution in 1851.  In 1853 he visited Germany, where he continued his theological studies.

Upon returning from Europe in 1854, he was appointed professor of divinity at Yale, and he was ordained as pastor of the College church. In 1861, he resigned these positions to become a professor of ecclesiastical history. In 1901, he became emeritus professor.  Fisher was elected a member of the American Antiquarian Society in 1879. He was president of the American Historical Association in 1898.

He was a frequent contributor to The New Englander, of which quarterly he was an editor beginning in 1866.

Fisher died in Litchfield, Connecticut on December 20, 1909, and was buried at Grove Street Cemetery in New Haven.

Works
Essays on the Supernatural Origin of Christianity, with special reference to the Theories of Renan, Strauss, and the Tübingen School (1865; enlarged ed. 1871)
Life of Benjamin Silliman, M.D., LL.D., Late Professor of Chemistry, Mineralogy, and Geology in Yale College (2 vols., 1866)
History of the Reformation, based on an 1871 course of lectures at the Lowell Institute, Boston, on the Protestant Reformation (1873)
The Beginnings of Christianity (1877)
Faith and Rationalism (1879)
The Christian Religion (1882)
The Grounds of Theistic and Christian Belief (1883)
The Christian Religion (1886)
Manual of Christian Evidences (1890)
Brief History of the Nation (1890)
Colonial History of the United States (1892)
Manual of Natural Theology (1893)
History of the Christian Church (1893)
History of Christian Doctrine (1896)
Outline of Universal History (1904)

Notes

References

External links
 
 
1898 Presidential Address to the American Historical Association

1827 births
1909 deaths
People from Wrentham, Massachusetts
American historians of religion
American theologians
Brown University alumni
Presidents of the American Historical Association
Yale Divinity School alumni
Yale Divinity School faculty
Historians of Christianity
Members of the American Antiquarian Society
Andover Theological Seminary alumni
Historians from Massachusetts
Burials at Grove Street Cemetery